Stephen Rae may refer to:

Stephen Rae (footballer) (born 1952), Australian rules footballer 
Stephen Rae (composer) (born 1961), Australian composer, musician and actor
Stephen Rae (editor) (born 1960s), Irish news editor
Steve Rae, in List of Barrow Raiders players

See also
Stephen Ray (disambiguation)
Stephen Rea (born 1946), Irish film and stage actor